Gregory VII (secular name Gregory Zervoudakis, ; 21 September 1850 – 17 November 1924) was Ecumenical Patriarch of Constantinople from 1923 until 1924. He was the Metroplitan of Chalcedon before being elevated to the patriarchal throne.  He imported the New Style Calendar to the Church of Constantinople. He died suddenly of a massive heart attack in 1924.

References

External links
His All Holiness, Ecumenical Patriarch Gregory VII of Constantinople

1850 births
1924 deaths
People from Sifnos
20th-century Ecumenical Patriarchs of Constantinople
Bishops of Chalcedon